The Belize national football team represents Belize in international football and is controlled by the Football Federation of Belize, a member of the Central American Football Union of CONCACAF.

Although Belize has never qualified for a FIFA World Cup tournament, it has once qualified for a CONCACAF Gold Cup championship in 2013, in which they were eliminated in the group stage. Belize has also competed in the sub-regional Central American Cup championship in which their best result was fourth place in 2013. The nickname for the players of the national team is the "Jaguars".

History

Overview
Named British Honduras whilst under British colonial rule, the country's first international game came on February 19, 1928, beating Honduras 1–0. Following independence, Belize's first game came on December 8, 1983, in a 2–0 loss against Canada in Belize. Although Belize gained independence from the United Kingdom in 1981 (and many of the UK's current colonies have international teams), Belize did not begin to regularly play international football until 1995. It made its debut at the 1995 UNCAF Nations Cup and was eliminated in the first round after losing to El Salvador and Costa Rica.

Belize has never qualified for the World Cup but finished fourth in the 2013 Copa Centroamericana.  Their fourth-place finish in the 2013 Copa Centroamericana gave Belize its first qualification to a major international competition, that being the 2013 CONCACAF Gold Cup.

June 2011 suspension by FIFA
On June 15, 2011, Belize kicked off its 2014 FIFA World Cup qualification campaign against minnows Montserrat, winning 2–5 away in a match played in the Ato Boldon Stadium in Couva, Trinidad. However, the return which was scheduled for June 19 was postponed by FIFA when they
suspended the FFB due to governmental interference.

Stadium
FFB Field in Belmopan is the home stadium for the Belize national football team. Prior to this stadium, Belize had no facilities that met FIFA specifications. Apart from this Belize has many fields to play on but with no facilities for the players.

Schedule and recent results

The following is a list of match results in the last 12 months, as well as any future matches that have been scheduled.

2022

2023

Coaching staff

Coaching history

Since the creation of the national team in 1995, several coaches have been in charge of managing Belize. From 1995 to 1996, Winston Michael was appointed as Belize's first ever manager. , the Belize national football team has had 11 managers.

Players

Current squad
 The following players were called up for the 2022–23 CONCACAF Nations League matches.
 Match dates: 2, 5, 9 and 14 June 2022

Recent call-ups
The following players have been called up within the past 12 months.

INJ Withdrew due to injury
PRE Preliminary / Standby squad
RET Retired from the national team
SUS Serving suspension
WD Player withdrew from the squad due to non-injury issue.

RecordsPlayers in bold are still active with Belize.Competition records

FIFA World Cup

CONCACAF Championship & Gold Cup

CONCACAF Nations League

Copa Centroamericana

The 1995 tournament in El Salvador saw Belize's international debut. They played the hosts in their first-ever international on November 29 in Group A. El Salvador won 3–0 with all goals coming in the second half. On December 1, Belize scored their first-ever international goal as they lost 2–1 to Costa Rica and were eliminated from the tournament. Both other teams advanced to the semi-finals and were defeated there, Costa Rica's conqueror Honduras beat Guatemala in the final.

Head-to-head recordUpdated on 27 March 2022 after match against ''

References

External links
 Football Federation of Belize official website
 Belize at FIFA.com
 Official Instagram

 
Central American national association football teams
1995 establishments in Belize
Association football clubs established in 1995